Nimisha Mukerji is a Canadian film and television director. She has directed episodes of Mech-X4 and Gabby Duran & the Unsittables.

Career
Mukerji's debut feature, 65 Redroses (2009), was one of the first official selections by Oprah Winfrey for her Documentary Club on OWN. Distributed by PBS International, Ro*co, and Hellocoolworld, 65_Redroses was commissioned by the CBC and acquired by Netflix and Hulu. Mukerji's second feature, Blood Relative (2012), was produced for Knowledge Network and screened in competition at Hot Docs 2013, winning the Audience Awards in Vancouver, New York, and Paris before receiving three Canadian Screen Award nominations, including Best Direction in a Documentary Program, Mukerji's second nomination in this category.

Her short narrative works include The Arrival Hour, In the Deep, and Beauty Mark, which was the official selection by Telefilm Canada's Not Short on Talent Program at the 2013 Cannes Film Festival. Mukerji is an alumnus of TIFF's Talent Lab and sits on the boards of DOC National and Point of View. She was the  recipient of the 2014 Women in Film & Television Artistic Achievement Award and the 2015 Directors Guild of Canada's Mentorship Award.

Her latest feature, Tempest Storm, was released in 2016 and is being produced with Super Channel, ARTE, and SWR for distribution by Mongrel Media.

References

External links
 

Living people
Canadian women film directors
Canadian documentary film directors
Canadian television directors
Canadian women television directors
Asian-Canadian filmmakers
Canadian women documentary filmmakers
Year of birth missing (living people)